Ganesh Peth or Ganesh Peth Colony is a locality based in the city district of Nagpur, Maharashtra. It belongs to Vidarbh region of the Nagpur Division and is close to some destinations in Nagpur like the ST (State Transport) Stand Square, Shukrwari Lake and Ramwadi. The colony also has one of the tallest buildings in Nagpur, called the Godrej Anandam. The colony also has its own police station unlike other localities. The Ganesh Peth police station is just situated at a walkable distance from the colony.

Population and demographics 

Nearby areas 
Ganesh Peth Colony is 1.36 Km away from Hanuman Nagar, 1.62 Km from Mahal,1.72 Km from Sitabuldi, 1.82 Km from Gandhibagh and 2.54 Km from Reshim Bagh. Sampriti Nagar and Vanjari are some popular nearby areas to the colony.

Nearest airport and railway station 

References

Tourist attractions in Nagpur district
Nagpur district
Nagpur division
Cities and towns in Nagpur district
Neighbourhoods in Nagpur
Nagpur-related lists